Percival Hubbard (1 April 1905 – 1981) was a South African cricketer. He played in 28 first-class matches for Border from 1929/30 to 1946/47.

See also
 List of Border representative cricketers

References

External links
 

1905 births
1981 deaths
South African cricketers
Border cricketers
People from Makhanda, Eastern Cape
Cricketers from the Eastern Cape